Les Dix Commandements is a French-language musical comedy written by Élie Chouraqui and Pascal Obispo that premiered in Paris in October 2000.

In 2022, the musical is announced to premiere in the English language with an American adaptation by David Serero (starring as Moses) in New York. The U.S. Cast Album Recording's first single "The Maximum Pain" is released.

The musical in two acts became the basis of similar musicals elsewhere including Patrick Leonard's film The Ten Commandments: The Musical.

Cast
Principal actors
 Pedro Alves (Aaron)
 Lisbet Guldbaek (Bithia)
 Daniel Lévi (Moses)
 Ginie Line (Nefertari)
 Ahmed Mouici (Ramsès)
 Nourith (Sephora)
 Pablo Villafranca (Joshua)
 Anne Warin (Yokébed)
 Yael Naim (Myriam)
Comedian
Jocelyn Durvel (Séthi)
Alternative actors
 Joshaa: Moses
 Anath Benais: Nefertari and Séphora 
 Patrice Carmona: Ramsés
 Emmanuel Dahl: Joshua and Aaron
 Delphine Elbe: Bithia, Yochébed and Myriam
New casting
 Merwan Rim (Ramsès)
 Joana (Séphora and Yochébed)
 Alexandra Lucci (Nefertari)
 Clarisse Lavanant (Sephora and Bithia)
 Fabian Richard (Joshua and Aaron)
 Anissa Stili (Myriam)
 Richard Ross (Moses)
 Chris Martin  (Moses)

Technical staff 
Direction: Elie Chouraqui
Music: Pascal Obispo
Texts: Lionel Florence and Patrice Guirao
Choreography: Kamel Ouali
Decor: Giantito Burchiellaro
Costumes: Sonia Rykiel
Production label: 7 ART
Producers: Elie Chouraqui, Dove Attia and Albert Cohen
Director of casting: Bruno Berberes

Songs
Act 1
 Introduction: Les prières du monde (Introduction: The Prayers of The World) (Moïse)
 Le massacre (The Slaughter) (Orchestre)
 Je laisse à l'abandon (I Let To Abandon) (Yokebed/Bithia)
 Il s'appellera Moïse (He Will Be Called Moses) (Bithia)
 Séthi et son Empire (Seti and His Empire) (Orchestre)
 Le dilemme (The Dilemma) (Nefertari/Moïse/Ramses)
 Désaccord (Disagreement)(Orchestre)
 À chacun son rêve (Every Man has a dream) (Moïse/Ramses)
 Le peuple Juif (The Jewish People) (Orchestre)
 La peine maximum (The Maximum Pain) (Joshua/Aaron)
 En cadence (Rhythmically) (Orchestre)
 Je n'avais jamais prié (I Had Never Prayed) (Joshua/Moïse)
 Le procès (The Trial) (Orchestra)
 Sans lui (Without Him) (Nefertari/Ramses)
 Oh Moïse (Oh Moses) (Yokebed/Aaron/Myriam/Bithia)
 La rencontre (The Encounter) (Orchestra)
 Il est celui que je voulais (He is The One I Wanted) (Sephora)

Act 2
 Celui qui va/Le Buisson Ardent (Whoever Goes/The Burning Bush) (Moïse)
 Mais tu t’en vas (But You leave) (Sephora/Nefertari/Myriam/Bithia/)
 C’est ma volonté (It's My Will) (Ramses/Myriam)
 Laisse mon peuple s’en aller (Let My People Go) (Yokebed/Moise/Hebrews)
 À chacun son glaive (Every Man Has His Sword) (Ramses/Moïse)
 Les dix plaies (The Ten Plagues) (Orchestra)
 L’inacceptable (The Unacceptable) (Nefertari)
 L.I.B.R.E. (Liberty) (Myriam/Hebrews)
 Devant la mer (Before The Sea) (Aaron)
 Mon frère (My Brother) (Ramses/Moïse)
 Une raison d’espérer (A Reason To Hope) (Sephora)
 Le veau d’or (The Golden Calf) (Orchestra)
 Les dix commandements (The Ten Commandments) (Moïse/Hebrews)
 L'envie d'aimer/Final (The Desire To Love) (Full Cast)

Discography
L'intégral (CD double album  - released 18 April 2001)
CD1
 Je Laisse à L'abandon
 Il S'appellera Moïse
 Le Dilemme
 À Chacun Son Rêve
 La Peine Maximum
 Je N'avais Jamais Prié
 Sans Lui
 Oh Moïse
 Il Est Celui Que Je Voulais
CD2
 Celui Qui Va
 Mais Tu T'en Vas
 C'est Ma Volonté
 Laisse Mon Peuple S'en Aller
 À Chacun Son Glaive
 L'inacceptable
 L.i.b.r.e.
 Devant La Mer
 Mon Frère
 Une Raison D'espérer
 Simple album (1 CD)

 Je laisse à l'abandon
 Il s'appellera Moïse
 Le dilemme
 À chacun son rêve
 La peine maximum
 Oh Moïse
 Il est celui que je voulais
 Mais tu t'en vas
 Laisse mon peuple s'en aller
 L-I-B-R-E
 Devant La Mer
 Mon frère
 Les dix commandements
 L'envie d'aimer

Technical staff
 Christophe Deschamps - drums
 Laurent Vernerey - bass
 Ian Inverd & Christophe Voisin - programming and keyboards
 Pierre Jaconelli - guitar
 Denis Benarrosch - percussions
 Jean-Yves d'Angelo - piano
 Nick Ingman, David Sinclair Whitaker & Olivier Schultheis - arrangements
 Les Archets de Paris et de France - orchestra

References

2000 musicals
Ten Commandments
Sung-through musicals
Musicals based on the Bible
Cultural depictions of Moses
Cultural depictions of Nefertari
French musicals